Debendranath Champia (born 24 February 1942), sometimes spelled as Devendra Nath Champia, is an Indian politician and a former member of the Bihar constituency assembly. He represented the Majhgaon (Vidhan Sabha constituency) of Jharkhand, and he is a member of the Indian National Congress (INC) political party.

References 

1942 births
Living people
Jharkhand politicians
Indian National Congress politicians from Bihar